Division No. 7 is one of eighteen census divisions in the province of Saskatchewan, Canada, as defined by Statistics Canada. It is located in the south-central part of the province. The most populous community in this division is Moose Jaw.

Demographics 

Census subdivisions 
The following census subdivisions (municipalities or municipal equivalents) are located within Saskatchewan's Division No. 7.

Cities
Moose Jaw

Towns
Central Butte
Craik
Herbert
Morse

Villages

Aylesbury
Beechy
Brownlee
Caronport
Chaplin
Coderre
Ernfold
Eyebrow
Hodgeville
Keeler
Lucky Lake
Marquis
Mortlach
Riverhurst
Rush Lake
Shamrock
Tugaske
Tuxford
Waldeck

Resort villages
Beaver Flat
Coteau Beach
Mistusinne
South Lake
Sun Valley

Rural municipalities

 RM No. 131 Baildon
 RM No. 132 Hillsborough
 RM No. 133 Rodgers
 RM No. 134 Shamrock
 RM No. 135 Lawtonia
 RM No. 136 Coulee
 RM No. 161 Moose Jaw
 RM No. 162 Caron
 RM No. 163 Wheatlands
 RM No. 164 Chaplin
 RM No. 165 Morse
 RM No. 166 Excelsior
 RM No. 191 Marquis
 RM No. 193 Eyebrow
 RM No. 194 Enfield
 RM No. 222 Craik
 RM No. 223 Huron
 RM No. 224 Maple Bush
 RM No. 225 Canaan
 RM No. 226 Victory
 RM No. 255 Coteau
 RM No. 256 King George

Other communities
Hamlets

Bateman
Birsay
Bushell Park
Caron
Courval
Crestwynd
Demaine
Dunblane
Gouldtown
Main Centre
Neidpath
Parkbeg
Prairie View
Riverhurst
Rush Lake
Shamrock
Tugaske
Tuxford

See also 
List of census divisions of Saskatchewan
List of communities in Saskatchewan

References

Division No. 7, Saskatchewan Statistics Canada

 
07